John Duncan McArthur (June 25, 1854 – January 10, 1927) was an important Canadian industrialist and railway builder. He built lines in Manitoba, Saskatchewan, and Alberta. He also was principal in many hotels, lumber and fuel companies.

After 74 years of a long prosperous life McArthur died just after arriving on a train from Battle Creek, Michigan, to Winnipeg in a private train car supplied by Michigan Central Railway. He had been undergoing treatments for acute anemia. After being educated at a local school and spending much of his childhood at his father's farm he travelled west in 1879 where he began his career in the railroad business.
He returned east to marry his childhood sweetheart, Mary McIntosh, in 1889. In 1901, McArthur decided to invest in a saw mill and brick factory. However, it was not until 1906 that he took on the major job of constructing  of the Grand Trunk Pacific Railway. Four years later McArthur almost went bankrupt on the construction of the Edmonton, Dunvegan and British Columbia Railway. He tried to build an extensive system in Alberta, the Edmonton, Dunvegan and British Columbia Railway, which was hampered by the First World War.

References

External links
Manitobans Who Made a Difference: John Duncan McArthur

1854 births
1927 deaths
Canadian company founders
Canadian railway entrepreneurs
Businesspeople from Manitoba
20th-century Canadian businesspeople
Canadian construction businesspeople
19th-century Canadian businesspeople